Emeka Francis Atuloma (born 1 October 1992) is a Nigerian international footballer who plays for Rivers United, as a midfielder.

Career
He has played club football for Dolphins and Rivers United.

He made his international debut for Nigeria in 2018.

References

1992 births
Living people
Nigerian footballers
Nigeria international footballers
Dolphin F.C. (Nigeria) players
Rivers United F.C. players
Association football midfielders
Nigeria A' international footballers
2018 African Nations Championship players